Koolhof is a Dutch surname. Notable people with the surname include:

Dean Koolhof (born 1994), Dutch footballer
Jurrie Koolhof (1960–2019), Dutch former football player and manager
Wesley Koolhof (born 1989), Dutch tennis player

Dutch-language surnames